Anthony George Pashos (born August 3, 1980) is a former American football offensive tackle who played in the National Football League (NFL). He was drafted by the Baltimore Ravens in the fifth round of the 2003 NFL Draft. He played college football at Illinois.

Pashos also played for the Cologne Centurions, Jacksonville Jaguars, Washington Redskins, and San Francisco 49ers.

Early life
Born in Palos Heights, Illinois, Pashos attended Lockport Township High School in Lockport, Illinois and graduated in 1998.

College career
At the University of Illinois, Pashos started all 47 games of his collegiate career at right tackle, beginning in 1999, and was named First-Team All-Big Ten in 2001 and 2002.

Professional career

Baltimore Ravens
Pashos was picked with the 173rd overall selection in the 5th round of the 2003 NFL Draft by the Baltimore Ravens.

Jacksonville Jaguars
On March 2, 2007, the Jacksonville Jaguars signed Pashos on the first day of free agency. He started 31 of 32 games for the Jaguars at right tackle. On September 5, 2009 Pashos was cut by the Jaguars to make room for Eben Britton.

San Francisco 49ers
Pashos signed with the San Francisco 49ers on September 6, 2009.

On October 25, 2009 in a game against the Houston Texans, Pashos fractured his left scapula. He was placed on season-ending injured reserve the next day.

Cleveland Browns
Pashos signed with the Cleveland Browns on March 7, 2010. The Browns released Pashos on March 12, 2012.

Washington Redskins
Pashos signed with the Washington Redskins on March 11, 2013. The Redskins waived Pashos on August 31, 2013 for final roster cuts before the start of 2013 season.

Oakland Raiders
He was signed by the Oakland Raiders on September 2, 2013, as an offensive tackle replacing Alex Barron on the 53-man roster.

Personal life
Pashos is the son of Greek immigrants and speaks three languages: Greek, German, and English. Pashos supported Republican presidential candidate Ron Paul in the 2012 presidential election  and Donald Trump in the 2016 presidential election.  Tony Pashos is currently living in an estate in Manteno, Illinois. Tony is a third year law student at Northwestern Pritzker School of Law. He interned at the White House in 2018 for his 1L summer.

References

External links
Oakland Raiders bio
San Francisco 49ers bio

1980 births
Living people
American people of Greek descent
Sportspeople from Cook County, Illinois
People from Lockport, Illinois
Players of American football from Chicago
American football offensive tackles
Illinois Fighting Illini football players
Baltimore Ravens players
Cologne Centurions (NFL Europe) players
Jacksonville Jaguars players
San Francisco 49ers players
Cleveland Browns players
Washington Redskins players
Oakland Raiders players